The 1888–89 season was the 11th season in the history of West Bromwich Albion, as well as their first season in the newly formed Football League, of which they were a founder member. They finished in 6th position with 22 points.

Final league table

Results

West Bromwich Albion's score comes first

Legend

Football League

FA Cup

Appearances

See also
1888–89 in English football
List of West Bromwich Albion F.C. seasons

Footnotes

References 
Citations

Sources

West Bromwich Albion F.C. seasons
West